Judah bar Ilai, also known as Yehuda bar Ma'arava (lit. "Judah of the West") and Rabbi Judah, was a rabbi of the 2nd century (fourth generation of tannaim). Of the many Judahs in the Talmud, he is the one referred to simply as "Rabbi Judah" and is the most frequently mentioned sage in the Mishnah.

Biography
Judah bar Ilai was born at Usha in the Galilee. His teachers were his father Rabbi Ilai I (himself a pupil of Eliezer b. Hyrcanus), Rabbi Akiba, and Rabbi Tarfon. He studied under Tarfon in early youth, and was so closely associated with R. Tarfon that he even performed menial services for him.

He was ordained by Rabbi Judah ben Baba at a time when the Roman government forbade ordination. Judah bar Ilai was forced to flee Hadrian's persecution.

Almost at the beginning of Hadrian's persecution, Judah ben Ilai was forced to flee from Usha and conceal himself; and he often related episodes of the "times of peril". When, after the revocation of Hadrian's edicts of persecution, the pupils of Akiba held their reunions and councils in Usha, Judah received the right to express his opinion before all others, thus being "Rosh ha-Medabbebrim" (leader among the speakers), on the ground that he was the best authority on the traditions. He was intimately associated with the patriarch Simeon ben Gamliel II, in whose house he is said to have been entrusted with the decision in matters pertaining to the religious law. He was also able to win the confidence of the Romans by his praise of their civilizing tendencies as shown in their construction of bridges, highways, and marketplaces.

Judah's personal piety was most rigid; and he observed many of the practises of the Ḥasidim and the Essenes. He drank no wine except on the days when the Law required, and preferred to eat only vegetable food. On Friday, after he had bathed and clad himself in white to prepare for the Sabbath, he seemed to his pupils an angel. According to a later rule of interpretation, Judah b. Ilai is meant in all passages reading, "It once happened to a pious man". He was naturally passionate and irascible, but such was his self-control that he seemed the reverse. Thus he once showed exceptional mildness when he had an opportunity to reconcile a married couple. The study of the Law was his chief and dearest occupation; and he lamented the fact that such a devotion was no longer widespread as in former times. Yet his interest in the joys and sorrows of his fellow men was keener still. Whenever a funeral or a wedding-procession passed, he interrupted his study to join it.

Judah lived in the utmost poverty. His wife made with her own hands a cloak which served them both in turn: the wife as she went to the market; the husband on his way to the college. Nevertheless, he declined all assistance, since he had accustomed himself to the simplest mode of life, and on principle desired to have no delight in this world.

Tomb

Judah lived to a ripe old age, surviving his teachers and all of his colleagues. Among his disciples who paid him the last honors was Judah ha-Nasi.

His grave was shown at Ein Zeitim beside the tomb of his father.

Obadiah of Bartenura, after visiting his tomb, wrote in 1495:
"About as far from Safed as one may walk on a Sabbath is the grave of the talmudic master Rabbi Judah bar Ilai; and there is a little village there called Ein Zetim. On the grave is a handsome tomb at which candles are lit..."

Italian pilgrim Moses Basola (1523) wrote:
"They say that once a Muslim woman climbed the tree on the grave in order to gather almonds, upon which the other women told her to first ask the saint's permission. But she showered them with curses. She fell off the tree, breaking all her limbs. She then pledged the gold bracelets on her hands to the saint, purchasing olive trees with them. Subsequently others made pledges as well, and at present he [the saint] has four hundred olive trees. This episode of the woman took place about sixty years ago."

Teaching

Halacha
Judah often teaches the Mishnah of Eliezer, which he had received from his father. He frequently explains the traditional halakhot by particularizations introduced by the phrases "Ematai?" (= "When does this statement apply?") and "Bameh debarim amurim?" (= "In what connection was this said?"). His most frequent teachings, however, are the doctrines of his master Akiba. His own halakhot he sets forth in the form of midrashim, for in his view, mishnah and midrash are identical. Those who devote themselves only to "mishnah" (that is, to the stereotyped halakhah without its Scriptural basis, he terms "enemies"; but those who direct their attention to the Scriptures are "brothers." Yet it is only they who interpret or expound the Bible who receive this latter name; for he who makes a literal translation of a verse of Scripture is a "liar," and he who adds to it a "blasphemer".

In his Biblical interpretation and in the deduction of legal requirements from it, Judah adheres strictly to the method of his teacher Akiba, whose rules of exegesis he adopts. It is thus that he explains a word apparently superfluous, and employs the rules of "al tiḳri" and "noṭariḳon". Nevertheless, he interprets also according to the older Halakah in cases where he deduces a definition from the literal wording of a passage, and bases his explanation strictly on its obvious meaning, "debarim ki-ketavan". Most of the Sifra is to be attributed to Judah, nearly all the anonymous statements in it being his, "Setam Sifra R. Yehudah". Of his exegetical principles only one need be noted: "In the Holy Scriptures certain phrases which border on blasphemy have been altered".

Aggadah
Many aggadic utterances and traditions of Judah's have been preserved. His traditions regarding the Temple at Jerusalem are very numerous; and special interest attaches to his accounts of the origin of the Temple of Onias and of the Septuagint, as well as to his description of the synagogue at Alexandria and of the conditions and institutions of antiquity.

His high conception of the calling and the responsibility of a teacher of the Law, as well as his mild judgment of the multitude, was expressed in his interpretation of Isaiah 58:1: "Show my people their transgression"—that is, the teachers of the Law, from whose errors wickedness arises—"and the house of Jacob their sins"—that is, the ignorant, whose wickedness is only error.

Many of Judah's maxims and proverbs have likewise been preserved; they include:
 "Great is the giving of charity, as it brings near the [day of] redemption."
 "Great is labour, as it improves man's lot"
 "He that does not teach his son a trade, it is as though he had taught him brigandage"
 "The best path lies midway"

References

Mishnah rabbis
2nd-century rabbis
People from Northern District (Israel)